Phegaea or Phegaia was a deme of ancient Attica in the phyle of Aigeis. The Suda places Phegaea in the phyle of Aeantis.

Phegaea's site is tentatively located near modern Ierotsakouli.

References

Populated places in ancient Attica
Former populated places in Greece
Demoi